Annette Kouamba Matondo is a film director, journalist and blogger from the Republic of the Congo. She is editor of La Nouvelle République, a newspaper based in Brazzaville. Her first film, On n'oublie pas, on pardonne, commemorates the disappearance of 353 refugees in 1999 from the port in Brazzaville. In it the actress Sylvie Dyclos-Pomos writes a play based on the event. The title uses a phrase associated with Nelson Mandela. The film was described by film-maker Beti Ellerson as "cathartic". Her second film, De quoi avons-nous peur? raises awareness of censorship and self-censorship in journalism. In a third film, Au-delà de la souffrance, she draws attention to the explosion on 4 March 2012 at an ammunition depot in Mpila.

Filmography 

 On n'oublie pas, on pardonne (2010)
 De quoi avons-nous peur ? (2010)
 Au-delà de la souffrance (2012)

Awards 

 Best Documentary: De quoi avons-nous peur ? - Tazama Festival Festival (2010)
 Audience Award: On n'oublie pas, on pardonne - Festival Ciné Sud de Cozes (2011)

References 

Living people
Date of birth missing (living people)
Republic of the Congo film directors
Screenwriters
Republic of the Congo journalists
Newspaper editors
Republic of the Congo women journalists
African bloggers
Year of birth missing (living people)
Women film directors